Brent Rowan (born May 28, 1956 in Waxahachie, Texas) is an American session musician and record producer who works primarily in country music. Active since the 1970s, Rowan began working with John Conlee through the recommendation of record producer Bud Logan. Rowan first played on Conlee's "Friday Night Blues", and later became the only guitarist for Conlee's recordings.

He also played guitar for Alabama, Alan Jackson, Chris LeDoux, Clay Walker, Confederate Railroad, and others. In 1989, Rowan was awarded Guitarist of the Year by Academy of Country Music.

Rowan produced Joe Nichols' Man with a Memory. He has also produced for McHayes, Julie Roberts, and Blake Shelton.

Selected discography

References

1956 births
American country guitarists
American male guitarists
American country record producers
Living people
People from Waxahachie, Texas
20th-century American guitarists
Country musicians from Texas
Record producers from Texas
20th-century American male musicians